Bogroy is a small crofting village, located 0.5 miles northwest of  Carrbridge, in Strathspey, in the county of  Inverness-shire, Scottish Highlands and is in the Scottish council area of Highland. It lies off the A9 road on the A938 road, west of Skye of Curr, east of Findhom Bridge and northwest of Boat of Garten. The Dulnain river passes close to Bogroy.

References

Populated places in Badenoch and Strathspey